Tornes is a village in Hustadvika Municipality in Møre og Romsdal county, Norway. The village is located along the Julsundet strait at the mouth of the Frænfjorden.

References

Hustadvika (municipality)
Villages in Møre og Romsdal